Javier 'Javi' Castellano Betancor (born 2 November 1987) is a Spanish professional footballer who plays as a defensive midfielder for UD Logroñés.

Club career
Born in Las Palmas, Canary Islands, Castellano graduated from UD Las Palmas' youth setup, and made his senior debut with the reserves in 2006, in Tercera División. On 2 January 2008 he appeared in his first game as a professional, playing the full 90 minutes in a 2–1 away loss against Villarreal CF in the round of 32 of the Copa del Rey.

On 31 January 2008, Castellano moved to another reserve team, RCD Mallorca B also in the fourth division. On 14 August, he was loaned to Segunda División B club Cultural Leonesa in a season-long deal.

After another loan stints at Albacete Balompié and Real Unión, Castellano cut ties with the Balearic Islands side in June 2011. Late in the month, he returned to his first club Las Palmas after signing a three-year contract.

Castellano played 43 games in the 2014–15 campaign – playoffs included – helping to a return to La Liga after 13 years. He made his debut in the competition on 22 August 2015, featuring the full 90 minutes in a 1–0 defeat at Atlético Madrid. It was his only appearance of the campaign, due to a serious knee injury.

Personal life
Castellano's twin brother, Daniel, is also a footballer and a midfielder. He too represented Las Palmas.

References

External links
Las Palmas official profile 

1987 births
Living people
Spanish twins
Twin sportspeople
Spanish footballers
Footballers from Las Palmas
Association football midfielders
La Liga players
Segunda División players
Segunda División B players
Tercera División players
Primera Federación players
UD Las Palmas Atlético players
RCD Mallorca B players
Cultural Leonesa footballers
Albacete Balompié players
Real Unión footballers
UD Las Palmas players
UD Logroñés players